Kévin Reza (born 18 May 1988) is a French former professional road bicycle racer, who last rode for UCI ProTeam . He was named in the start list for the 2015 Vuelta a España.

Early life
Reza was born in May 1988 on the outskirts of Paris. His family originate from Guadeloupe.

Career
Reza signed his first professional contract in 2011 for French cycling team . In 2013 he took part in his first Grand Tour, the Tour de France, finishing in 134th position overall.

In 2015, Reza signed for French team . Whilst at FDJ, during the 2017 Tour de Romandie, Reza was a victim of racial abuse from  rider Gianni Moscon. Moscon was subsequently suspended from racing with Team Sky for six weeks.

In August 2017, Reza was named as one of fifteen riders joining new French cycling outfit . In June 2021, Reza announced that he would be retiring from cycling at the end of the season.

Activism and advocacy
At the 2020 Tour de France, Reza was involved in a small gesture of solidarity with the Black Lives Matter movement. As the only black rider in the race, he rode at the front of the peloton on the final day of racing.

Major results

2007
 3rd Madison, National Junior Track Championships
2008
 1st Stage 2 Vuelta Madrid Under-23
2009
 2nd Overall Circuit du Mené
 3rd Les Boucles de la Loire
 8th Overall Tour de Martinique
1st Stages 1, 5 & 8a
2010
 1st Les Boucles de la Loire
 7th Classic Loire Atlantique
2011
 3rd Madison, National Track Championships
2012
 9th Overall Rhône-Alpes Isère Tour
2013
 8th Cholet-Pays de Loire
 9th Brussels Cycling Classic
2014
 3rd Road race, National Road Championships
 6th Classic Loire Atlantique
 9th Overall Tour de Picardie
2015
 4th Classic Sud-Ardèche
 10th Classic Loire Atlantique
2016
 7th Overall Tour de Picardie
2017
 3rd Paris–Camembert
 8th Grand Prix de Plumelec-Morbihan
2018
 4th Paris–Chauny
 9th Grand Prix de Wallonie
2019
 6th Classic Loire Atlantique
 10th Heistse Pijl

Grand Tour general classification results timeline

References

External links
 
 

1988 births
Living people
French male cyclists
Sportspeople from Versailles, Yvelines
Cyclists from Île-de-France
Black French sportspeople
French people of Guadeloupean descent